Patricia Jones (16 October 1930 – 23 August 2000) was a Canadian athlete who competed mainly in the 100 metres. She was born in New Westminster. She competed for Canada in the 1948 Summer Olympics held in London, United Kingdom, in the 4 × 100 metres where she won the bronze medal with her teammates Viola Myers, Nancy MacKay and Diane Foster. Their 47.8-second time compares to the winning 47.5 seconds of the Netherlands and the 47.7 of the Australian team. In the individual 100 metres final she finished fifth, just behind Myers, both recording 12.3-second times against the winning 11.9-second run of Netherlands' Fanny Blankers-Koen.

References

1930 births
2000 deaths
Canadian female sprinters
Sportspeople from New Westminster
Olympic bronze medalists for Canada
Athletes (track and field) at the 1948 Summer Olympics
Olympic track and field athletes of Canada
Medalists at the 1948 Summer Olympics
Athletes (track and field) at the 1950 British Empire Games
Commonwealth Games bronze medallists for Canada
Commonwealth Games medallists in athletics
Olympic bronze medalists in athletics (track and field)
Olympic female sprinters
20th-century Canadian women
Medallists at the 1950 British Empire Games